The Hong Kong Drama Awards are a set of awards annually given for praiseworthy achievements in the field of stage. They are considered to be the most important stage awards in Hong Kong. The awards are presented each year at a formal ceremony. The judging panel of the awards comprise 57 people.

Hong Kong awards